Star of the Sea (Latin: stella maris) is an ancient title for the Virgin Mary.

Star of the Sea may also refer to:

Film
 The Star of the Sea (1915 film), a lost American silent film
 Star of the Sea (1928 film), an Italian silent film 
 Star of the Sea (1938 film), an Italian comedy

Literature
 Star of the Sea (novel), by Joseph O'Connor, 2004
 Havets stjärna ('Star of the Sea'), a 1906 work by Swedish poet Vilhelm Ekelund 
 "Star of the Sea", a 1991 short story in the Time Patrol series by Paul Anderson

Music
 "Star of the Sea", an 1883 song that provided the music for "Star of the East" (song), written in 1890
 "Star of the Sea", a 1996 work for chamber music by Chan Ka Nin
 "Star of the Sea", a song by Silvery from the 2008 album Thunderer & Excelsior
 Star of the Sea, a 2009 EP by Kai Altair

Other uses
 Star of the Sea, a British trawler sunk in 1917
 Star of the Sea, name of the D-548, a D-class lifeboat (EA16)
 Star of the Sea College, a Catholic girls' school in Melbourne, Australia
 Star of the Sea (basketball), a Northern Irish basketball team
 Star of the Sea, the Type 346 Radar, used in the Chinese navy
 Star of the Sea, a horse that came in third in the 1976 Hutcheson Stakes
 Star of the Sea Association, a fishermen's fraternity that originated the Newfoundland Tricolour flag
 Star of the Sea Hall, a historic place in St John's, Newfoundland, Canada

See also
 Stella Maris (disambiguation)
 Mary Star of the Sea (disambiguation)
 Our Lady Star of the Sea Church (disambiguation), the name of many churches